The Sponge Reef Project is a binational scientific project between Germany and Canada to study the sponge reefs off British Columbia, Canada, reefs formed by sponges of the Hexactinellid family.

The project was started in 1999, following the discovery of the reefs in 1991; earlier, this reef type was thought to have existed mainly in the Jurassic period.

External links
The Sponge Reef Project
B.C.'s Reefs Among Science's Great Finds | Straight.com

Reefs of the Pacific Ocean
Reefs